"Massachusetts (Because of You Our Land is Free)," words and music by Bernard Davidson, was made the official patriotic song of Massachusetts on October 23, 1989.

External links 
 M.G.L. 2:31, the law designating the official patriotic song of Massachusetts
Lyrics

Massachusetts
Symbols of Massachusetts
Music of Massachusetts
Songs about Massachusetts